The 28th Star Awards for Movies by the Philippine Movie Press Club (PMPC), honored the best Filipino films of 2011. The ceremony took place on March 14, 2012, at the Meralco Theater in Ortigas, Pasig.

The PMPC Star Awards for Movies was hosted by KC Concepcion, Derek Ramsay, Aga Muhlach and Anne Curtis. Manila Kingpin: The Asiong Salonga Story bagged 8 awards including "Movie of the Year" while In The Name of Love won 5 awards.

The event was televised at ABS-CBN's Sunday Best on March 18, 2012.

Winners and nominees
Winners are in bold text

Movie of the Year
Ang Panday 2 (Ramon Bong Revilla , Marian Rivera , Phillip Salvador, Rhian Ramos, Iza Calzado, Kris Bernal)In The Name Of Love (Angel Locsin, Aga Muhlach, Jake Cuenca)
Manila Kingpin: The Asiong Salonga Story (ER Ejercito, Carla Abellana)The Road (Barbie Forteza, Derrick Monasterio, Lexi Fernandez, Rhian Ramos, Louise delos Reyes, Alden Richards, Marvin Agustin, Carmina Villaroel, Renz Valerio)No Other Woman (Anne Curtis, Cristine Reyes, Derek Ramsay)Aswang (Paulo Avelino, Lovi Poe, Albie Casiño, Jillian Ward)My Neighbor's Wife (Lovi Poe, Carla Abellana, Dennis Trillo, Jake Cuenca)

Digital Movie of the YearAng Babae Sa Septic Tank (Eugene Domingo)Ang Sayaw ng Dalawang Kaliwang Paa (Paulo Avelino, LJ Reyes, Gloria Diaz)Ikaw Ang Pag-ibig (Gabby Concepcion and Mercedes Reyes)Patikul (Gina Pareño and Jaclyn Jose)Sa Ilalim Ng Tulay (Ronaldo Valdez, Susan Roces and Vilma Santos)Niño (Coco Martin and Alessandra De Rossi)Thelma'' (Maja Salvador)

Movie Director of the Year
Mac Alejandre (Ang Panday 2)
Ruel S. Bayani (No Other Woman)
Daryl dela Cruz (Manila Kingpin: The Asiong Salonga Story)
Olivia M. Lamasan (In The Name of Love)
Jun Lana (My Neighbor's Wife)
Yam Laranas (The Road)
Jerrold Tarog (Aswang)

Digital Movie Director of the Year
Marilou Diaz-Abaya (Ikaw Ang Pag-ibig)
Loy Arcenas (Niño)
Earl Bontuyan (Sa Ilalim Ng Tulay)
Joel Lamangan (Patikul)
Marlon Rivera (Ang Babae Sa Septic Tank)
Paul Soriano (Thelma)
Alvin Yapan (Ang Sayaw Ng Dalawang Kaliwang Paa)

Movie Actress of The Year
Ai-Ai delas Alas (Enteng Ng Ina Mo)
Anne Curtis (No Other Woman)
Eugene Domingo (Ang Babae Sa Septic Tank)
Angel Locsin (In The Name of Love)
Lovi Poe (My Neighbor's Wife)
Maja Salvador (Thelma)
Judy Ann Santos (My Househusband)

Movie Actor of the Year
Ryan Agoncillo (My Househusband)
Dingdong Dantes (Segunda Mano)
ER Ejercito (Manila Kingpin: the Asiong Salonga Story) - tied
Aga Muhlach (In The Name of Love) - tied
Martin Escudero (Zombadings 1: Patayin Sa Shokot Si Remington)
Derek Ramsay (No Other Woman)
Jericho Rosales (Yesterday Today and Tomorrow)

Movie Supporting Actress of the Year
Tetchie Agbayani (Thelma)
Shamaine Centenera-Buencamino (Niño)
Julia Clarete (Bisperas)
Eugene Domingo (My Househusband)
Angelica Panganiban (Segunda Mano)
Eliza Pineda (Thelma)
Lovi Poe (Yesterday, Today, Tomorrow)

Movie Supporting Actor of the Year
Art Acuña (Niño)
Tirso Cruz III  (Deadline)
Jake Cuenca (In The Name of Love) - tied
Baron Geisler (Manila Kingpin: The Asiong Salonga Story) - tied
John Regala (Manila Kingpin: The Asiong Salonga Story)
Phillip Salvador (Ang Panday 2)
Dennis Trillo (Yesterday, Today, Tomorrow)

Movie Child Performer of the Year
Christopher Canduli (Sa Ilalim Ng Tulay)
Bugoy Cariño (Shake Rattle & Roll XIII, "Tamawo" episode)
Zaijian Jaranilla (Pak! Pak! My Dr. Kwak!)
Jillian Ward (Aswang)
Yogo Singh (Ikaw Ang Pag-ibig)
Robert Villar (Ang Panday 2)
Xyriel Manabat (Pak! Pak! My Dr. Kwak)

New Movie Actress of the Year
Bonivie Budao (Busong)
Eula Caballero (Yesterday, Today and Tomorrow)
Joyce Ching (Tween Academy: Class of 2012)
Lexi Fernandez (Tween Academy: Class of 2012)
Solenn Heussaff (Temptation Island)

New Movie Actor of the Year
Albie Casiño (Aswang)
Matteo Guidicelli (Catch Me ...I'm In Love)
Elmo Magalona (Tween Academy: Class of 2012)
Derrick Monasterio (Tween Academy: Class of 2012)
Rocco Nacino (Ang Sayaw ng Dalawang Kaliwang Paa)
Alden Richards (The Road)

Movie Original Screenplay of the Year
Aloy Adlawan & Jerrold Tarog(Aswang)
Kriz Gazmen (No Other Woman)
Roy Iglesias (Manila Kingpin: The Asiong Salonga Story)
Olivia M. Lamasan & Enrico Santos (In The Name of Love)
RJ Nuevas (Ang Panday 2)

Digital Movie Original Screenplay of the Year
Earl A. Bontuyan (Sa Ilalim Ng Tulay)
Froilan Medina & Paul Soriano (Thelma)
Chris Martinez (Ang Babae Sa Septic Tank)
Rody Vera (Niño)
Alvin Yapan (Ang Sayaw ng Dalawang Kaliwang Paa)

Movie Cinematographer of the Year
Hermann Claravall (In The Name of Love)
Yam Laranas (Bulong)
Carlo Mendoza (Praybeyt Benjamin)
Charlie Peralta (No Other Woman)
Toto Uy (Ang Panday 2)

Digital Movie Cinematographer of the Year
Odyssey Flores (Thelma)
Larry Manda (Ang Babae Sa Septic Tank)
Louie Quirino (Busong)
Mccoy Tarnate (Boundary)
Arvin Viola (Ang Sayaw ng Dalawang Kaliwang Paa)

Movie Editor of the Year
Jason Canapay & Ryan Orduna (Praybeyt Benjamin)
Vito Cajili (No Other Woman)
Aleks Castaneda (Aswang)
Chrisel Galeno-Desuasido (Ang Panday 2)
Marya Ignacio (In The Name of Love)

Digital Movie Editor of the Year
Danny Añonuevo (Niño)
Mai Dionisio (Ang Sayaw ng Dalawang Kaliwang Paa)
Ike Veneracion (Ang Babae Sa Septic Tank)
Mark Victor and Fabienne Bucher (Thelma)
John Anthony Wong (Deadline)

Movie Production Designer of the Year
Michael Español (Shake Rattle & Roll XIII, "Rain, Rain, Go Away" episode)
Leo Abaya (In The Name of Love)
Fritz Silorio, Mona Soriano, & Ronaldo Cadapan (Bulong)
Richard Somes (Ang Panday 2)
Erick Torralba (My Neighbor's Wife)

Digital Movie Production Designer of the Year
Laida Lim (Niño)
Edgar Martin Littaua (Patikul)
Norman Regalado (Ang Babae Sa Septic Tank)
Aped Santos (Ang Sayaw ng Dalawang Kaliwang Paa)
Nina Torres (Thelma)

Movie Musical Scorer of the Year
Von de Guzman (In The Name of Love)
Von de Guzman (Ang Panday 2)
Jessie Lasaten (Enteng Ng Ina Mo)
Jesse Lucas (My Neighbor's Wife)
Raul Mitra (No Other Woman)

Digital Movie Musical Scorer of the Year
Archie Castillo (Thelma)
Ronald de Asis, Jerome Velasco, & JC De Asis (Sa Ilalim Ng Tulay)
Von de Guzman (Patikul)
Vincent de Jesus (Ang Babae Sa Septic Tank)
Christine Muco & Jema Pamintuan (Ang Sayaw ng Dalawang Kaliwang Paa)

Movie Sound Engineer of the Year
Ditoy Aguila (No Other Woman)
Aurel Bilbao (Segunda Mano)
Lamberto Casas Jr. & Alex Tomboc (Aswang)
Albert Michael Idioma (Manila Kingpin: The Asiong Salonga Story)
Albert Michael Idioma  (In The Name of Love)

Digital Movie Sound Engineer of the Year
Ditoy Aguila (Patikul)
Albert Michael Idioma & Addiss Tabong (Ang Babae Sa Septic Tank)
Albert Michael Idioma & Addiss Tabong (Thelma)
Raffy Magsaysay (Boundary)
Arnold Reodica (Ang Sayaw ng Dalawang Kaliwang Paa)

Movie Original Theme Song of the Year
"Hari ng Tondo" (Manila Kingpin: The Asiong Salonga Story)
"Tween Academy Anthem" (Tween Academy: Class of 2012)
"Who's That Girl" (Who's That Girl)

Digital Movie Original Theme Song of the Year
"Ikaw Ang Aking Pag-ibig" (Ikaw Ang Pag-ibig)
"Kinukumutan Ka Ng Aking Titig" (Ang Sayaw Ng Dalawang Kaliwang Paa)
"Sabaw" (Ang Babae Sa Septic Tank)
"Nowhere To Run" (Thelma)
"Paghihintay" from (Sa Ilalim Ng Tulay)

Special awards
Darling of The Press Award
Atty. Persida Acosta
Ulirang Artista Award
Eddie Gutierrez
Ulirang Alagad ng Pelikula sa Likod ng Kamera
Marilou Diaz-Abaya
Male Face of the Night 
Derek Ramsay
Female Face of the Night
Valerie Concepcion
Male Star of The Night
Aga Muhlach
Female Star of The Night
KC Concepcion
Miss. Great Shape Personality
Angel Locsin
Mr. Great Shape Personality
Derek Ramsay
Male Star with Radiant Skin
ER Ejercito
Female Star with Radiant Skin
Iwa Moto

References

PMPC